Lucchesiite is a new member of tourmaline-group of minerals. Lucchesiite has the formula CaFe3Al6(Si6O18)(BO3)3(OH)3O. It is the calcium and oxygen-analogue of schorl. It has two co-type localizations, one in Czech Republic and the other in Sri Lanka. As the other members of the tourmaline group, it is trigonal.

Notes on chemistry
Impurites in lucchesiite, depending on the provenience, are sodium, magnesium, aluminium, titanium, trivalent iron, and minor vanadium, potassium, manganese and zinc.

References

Cyclosilicates
Calcium minerals
Iron(II) minerals
Aluminium minerals
Borate minerals
Trigonal minerals
Minerals in space group 160
Tourmalines